Sean Doolittle (1971 Nebraska-) is an American author of crime and suspense fiction.

Career
Born and raised in southeastern Nebraska, Doolittle began publishing short stories in small press horror magazines and commercial anthologies while attending college at the University of Nebraska-Lincoln.

Doolittle's first novel, Dirt (UglyTown, 2001), shifted into crime fiction and appeared at #83 in the extended Amazon's Best Books of the Year listing (Top 100 Editors Picks, 2001). His second novel, Burn (UglyTown, 2003), was reprinted in paperback by Random House/Bantam Dell. Bantam Dell went on to publish Doolittle's next four crime novels, which garnered critical praise from The New York Times, The Wall Street Journal, The Washington Post, The Chicago Sun-Times, and People, among other publications, as well as from respected authors in the genre.

Doolittle's books have been translated in Brazil, France, The Netherlands, and Poland.

Novels
 Dirt (UglyTown, 2001)
 Burn (UglyTown, 2003; Bantam Dell, 2003)
 Rain Dogs (Bantam Dell, 2005)
 The Cleanup (Bantam Dell, 2006)
 Safer (Bantam Dell, 2009)
 Lake Country (Bantam Dell, 2012)
 Kill Monster (Audible Originals, Severn House, 2019)

Awards
 ITW Thriller Award – Best Paperback Original (Winner, Lake Country, 2013)
 Barry Award – Best Paperback Original (Winner, The Cleanup, 2007)
 Anthony Award – Best Paperback Original (Nomination, The Cleanup, 2007)
 CrimeSpree Magazine “Favorite Book” (Readers’ choice, The Cleanup, 2007)
 Spinetingler Award – Rising Star (Winner, The Cleanup, 2007) 
 ForeWord Magazine Book of the Year (Gold Medal, Burn, 2003)
 Derringer Award – Best Long Story (Tie, 2011)
 CWA/Macallan Short Story Dagger (Nomination, 2002)
 Nebraska Book Award honor book selections for Lake Country and The Cleanup

References

External links
Official Website

Living people
1971 births
Barry Award winners
20th-century American novelists
Writers from Nebraska
American crime fiction writers
21st-century American novelists
American male novelists
20th-century American male writers
21st-century American male writers